Elite (stylized as E L I T Ǝ) is a Spanish thriller teen drama television series created for Netflix by Carlos Montero and Darío Madrona. The series is set in Las Encinas, a fictional elite secondary school and revolves around the relationships between three working-class teenage students enrolled at the school through a scholarship program and their wealthy classmates. The series features an ensemble cast. Many of the cast previously featured in other Netflix works produced or distributed in Spain and Latin America.

The first season, consisting of eight episodes, was released on Netflix on 5 October 2018. It received positive reviews from critics and audiences, with many hailing the series as a "guilty pleasure", and praising its writing, acting and portrayal of mature themes. The second season was released on 6 September 2019. A third season was ordered in August 2019 and was released on 13 March 2020. In May 2020 and February 2021, Netflix renewed the series for a fourth and fifth season. The fourth season was released on 18 June 2021, and the fifth season on April 8, 2022. In October 2021, Netflix renewed the series for a sixth season. It was announced on October 25th, 2022, that Netflix renewed the series for a seventh season.The renewal came a month before the release of the sixth season. Filming is set to commence in late 2022.

Series overview

Episodes

Season 1 (2018)

Season 2 (2019)

Season 3 (2020)

Season 4 (2021)

Season 5 (2022)

Season 6 (2022)

References

External links 
 
 
 
 

Lists of Spanish television series episodes
Lists of LGBT-related television series episodes
Lists of teen television series episodes